

Rulers of the Gurmanche state of Jugu (Sugu)

Territory located in present-day Benin.

Sources
 http://www.rulers.org/benitrad.html

See also
Benin
Lists of office-holders

Benin history-related lists
Government of Benin